Dobrzenice Małe  is a village in the administrative district of Gmina Mochowo, within Sierpc County, Masovian Voivodeship, in east-central Poland. From the name of the village was derived a Polish surname Dobrzeniecki.

References

Villages in Sierpc County